Rio, formerly known as Rio Riva and Arriva is a British brand of soft drink made by Hall & Woodhouse.

History
The drink was created by Dorset brewery Hall & Woodhouse in the 1980s and was originally named Arriva derived from the French ‘arriver’ which means to arrive. In 1994, its name was changed to Rio Riva before being changed to simply Rio. In 2013, Dragon Rouge redesigned Rio in response to research that showed consumers knew the Rio name but didn’t know much about the drink itself. 

Rio was redesigned again in 2017 by Pearlfisher taking inspiration from Brazilian street art to target a younger demographic. The logo was changed as well, with the ‘O’ being turned into a sun to emphasise their slogan of "Celebrate the Sunny". In June of the same year, they introduced 500ml PET bottles. Brand manager Danielle Obbard said the new bottles were an integral part of their "plan for continued growth".

In 2018, Rio began sponsoring racing car driver Bobby Thompson.
In 2021, Rio entered a partnership deal with Boost Drinks, with the company now overseeing the sales, marketing and distribution of Rio.

References

British soft drink brands
Food and drink introduced in the 1980s